DeWalt is an American tool manufacturer.

DeWalt or Dewalt may also refer to:

People
 Kathleen Musante DeWalt, American academic
 Kevin DeWalt (born 1959), Canadian film and television producer
 Raymond DeWalt (1885–1961), American inventor and entrepreneur, founder of the DeWalt company
 Roy Dewalt (born 1956), American former Canadian Football League quarterback

Places
 DeWalt, Missouri City, Texas, United States, a former unincorporated community

See also
 Walt (disambiguation)